Les Dalton se rachètent is a Lucky Luke adventure written by Goscinny and illustrated by Morris. It is the 26th book in the series and it was originally published in French in 1965 and in English by Cinebook in 2012 as The Daltons Redeem Themselves.

Synopsis 
Following the enactment of a new law, the Daltons are paroled. If they commit a single offense within 30 days of release, they are immediately returned to prison. The Daltons then settle in the town of Tortilla Gulch to start their new life. Lucky Luke is responsible for checking that the Daltons remain really quiet during this probationary period.

Characters 

 The Dalton brothers: The nastiest, stupidest bandits in the west.

External links
Lucky Luke official site album index 
Goscinny website on Lucky Luke

Comics by Morris (cartoonist)
Lucky Luke albums
1965 graphic novels
Works by René Goscinny